Glaciarium is a modern glacier interpretation centre, built to entertain and educate about ice, glaciers and the Southern Patagonian Ice Field. It is located in the town of El Calafate, gateway to glaciers, in the Santa Cruz province, Patagonia, southern Argentina. It opened on January 17, 2011, with a ceremony that was attended by President Cristina Fernández de Kirchner. The building was designed by the architectural office Santiago Cordeyro Arquitectos and the architect Pablo Güiraldes.

The centre is dedicated to ice and glaciers, and is designed to educate visitors about these natural phenomena in depth. The scientific director is glaciologist Pedro Skvarca. Two halls house the permanent glaciological exhibits that include dioramas, multimedia, 3D models, and other modern resources. The third hall is a cultural venue and movie theatre where 3D documentaries and other films are screened.

Distinctions 
The Glaciarium has been declared of interest by the Argentine National Parks Bureau, the Province of Santa Cruz, and the National Congress of Cultural Interest.

Permanent Exhibits 

The permanent exhibits cover the formation of glaciers, the early explorers and scientists, how snow turns into ice, how glaciers move, the Earth's past, and the Patagonian glaciers.

Ice Bar 
In October 2011, an ice bar opened in the Glaciarium. It was billed as being the only bar in the world constructed completely from glacial ice. Despite being provided with capes, gloves, and boots, patrons are only allowed to stay in the bar for 20 minutes because of the cold.

References

External links 
 Glaciarium Website
 Official Facebook Fan Page of Glaciarium

Natural history museums in Argentina
Museums in Santa Cruz Province, Argentina